The Women's Professional American Football League (WPFL) was a women's professional American football league in the United States. With teams across the United States, the WPFL had its first game in 1999 with just two original teams: the Lake Michigan Minx and the Minnesota Vixens. Fifteen teams nationwide competed for the championship in 2006.

Unlike the other women's American football franchises, the WPFL operated as a fall league and not a spring league.

History
In 1999 two businessmen, Carter Turner and Terry Sullivan, decided to research the feasibility of a professional women’s football league by gathering together top female athletes into two teams and playing an exhibition game in front of an audience. The game between the Lake Michigan Minx and the Minnesota Vixens at the Hubert H. Humphrey Metrodome in Minneapolis, Minnesota was a success and turned into a six-game exhibition tour across the country dubbed the “No Limits” Barnstorming Tour.

The success of the Barnstorming Tour led to the first official WPFL season in 2000 with 11 teams competing nationwide. This first season ended with some turmoil however; the regular season was shortened by several games, players were not given their promised $100 per-game salaries, and there were allegations regarding instability with some of the league's financial backers.

The WPFL rebounded the next year completing the 2001 season after several organizational changes. Notable changes included the departure of founders Sullivan and Turner (Turner then founded the WAFL; restructure of the league by several WPFL team owners: Melissa Korpacz - New England Storm, Robin Howington - Houston Energy, and Donna Roebuck and Dee Kennamer - Austin Rage; changes to player/team compensation; and the moving of the start of the season from fall to summer.

Championships

See also
American football in the United States
Women's Football in the United States
Independent Women's Football League (IWFL)
National Women's Football Association
Women's American Football League (WAFL)
American Football Women's League (AFWL)
List of leagues of American football

References

 
Women's American football leagues